USS Sealion (SS-195), a Sargo-class submarine, was the first ship of the United States Navy to be named for the sea lion, any of several large, eared seals native to the Pacific.

Construction and commissioning
Sealion′s keel was laid down on 20 June 1938 by the Electric Boat Company of Groton, Connecticut. She was launched on 25 May 1939, sponsored by Mrs. Augusta K. Bloch, wife of Admiral Claude C. Bloch, Commander-in-Chief, United States Fleet, and commissioned on 27 November 1939.

Service history
Following shakedown, Sealion, assigned to Submarine Division 17 (SubDiv 17), prepared for overseas deployment. In the spring of 1940, she sailed, with her division for the Philippine Islands, arriving at Cavite in the fall to commence operations as a unit of the Asiatic Fleet. Into October 1941, she ranged from Luzon into the Sulu Archipelago, then, with her sister ship Seadragon, another submarine in SubDiv 202, she prepared for a regular overhaul at the Cavite Navy Yard. By 8 December, her yard period had begun; and, two days later, she took two direct hits in the Japanese air raid which demolished the navy yard.

The first bomb struck the aft end of her conning tower and exploded outside the hull, over the control room. The second smashed through a main ballast tank and caused the pressure hull to explode in the aft engine room, killing the four men, Sterling Cecil Foster, Melvin Donald O'Connell, Ernest Ephrom Ogilvie, and Vallentyne Lester Paul, then working there. In addition, one crewman, Howard Firth, died while a POW.

Sealion flooded immediately and settled down by the stern with 40% of her main deck underwater and a 15-degree list to starboard. The destruction of the navy yard made repairs impossible, and she was ordered destroyed. All salvageable equipment was taken off, depth charges were placed inside, and on 25 December, the explosives were set off to prevent her from being made useful to the enemy.

Successor
Eli Thomas Reich, who was executive officer and engineer on Sealion when it was sunk, assumed command of the second  in March 1944. Four of the six torpedoes that Sealion II fired to sink the  carried the names Foster, O'Connell, Paul and Ogilvie—the men who had been killed in the bombing of the first Sealion three years earlier.

In popular culture
The sinking of Sealion was incorporated into the plot of the 1959 Cary Grant film Operation Petticoat, where the fictional submarine Sea Tiger, also based at Cavite, suffers a similar fate, although in the film she is re-floated and ordered to Cebu for a complete refit, thereby setting the stage for the film's storyline.

In a graphic short story in El Alamein no Shinden, Sealion stops the German invasion of England, Operation Sealion, after Germans fire on her by accident while the United States was still a neutral country.

References

External links
On Eternal Patrol: USS Sealion

Sargo-class submarines
World War II submarines of the United States
Submarines sunk by aircraft
Lost submarines of the United States
Ships built in Groton, Connecticut
1939 ships
Maritime incidents in December 1941
Ships sunk by Japanese aircraft